Cromford railway station is a Grade II listed railway station owned by Network Rail and managed by East Midlands Railway. It is located in the village of Cromford in Derbyshire, England.

History

Originally known as Cromford Bridge, it was opened by the Manchester, Buxton, Matlock and Midlands Junction Railway in 1849. This is one of the few stations on the line that has been preserved and is a Grade 2 listed building. It is said to have been designed by G. H. Stokes, son-in-law of Joseph Paxton. It is believed that Stokes designed Station House (built in 1855), the extremely ornate former station master's residence opposite the station on the side of the hill as well as the ornate villa style waiting room, on what was the 'up' platform. According to English Heritage, this is the original station building. The present station building on the opposite (down) platform was added by the Midland Railway at a later date

The disused southbound platform was used for cover of the 1995 Oasis single "Some Might Say".

Following many years of neglect and decline, a long lease on the main station building was purchased by the Arkwright Society; the building has been restored and improved, re-opening as office space in May 2009. Station House, of which the old waiting room is a part, is now self-contained holiday accommodation.

In the year from 1 April 2009 to 31 March 2010, journeys from the station had increased by 16.88%.

On 17 September 2009, taxi driver Stuart Ludlam was murdered at the station by gun fanatic Colin Cheetham.

Station masters
On 18 January 1853, the station master William Lees was summoned by Joseph Wain, a clark employed by the railway at Matlock Bath, for having beaten him. It transpired that bad feeling had previously existed between the plaintiff and defendant; on 15 January 1853, they had met on the causeway between Matlock Bath and Cromford, close to the Glenorchy chapel. Both of them were on the pavement and a dispute arose between them as to the etiquette of taking the wall. Wain accused Lees of beating hum repeatedly but Lees denied it. The following year William Lees left Cromford. The Derbyshire Courier of 25 November 1854 reported that

William Lees 1849 - 1854
Edwin Furniss ca 1859 - 1881 
R. J. Oram 1881 - 1888 (afterwards station master at Chorlton-cum-Hardy)
Lewis Wright 1888 - 1894 (afterwards station master at Edale)
Harry l’Anson 1894 - 1898 (afterwards station master at Chinley)
H. V. Weston 1898 - 1902 (afterwards station master at Cheadle Heath)
J. G. Goss 1902 - 1907 (afterwards station master at Bamford)
Thomas Cooper 1907 - 1913 (formerly station master at Hazel Grove, afterwards station master at Belle Vue, Manchester)
William Brown 1913 - 1921
Walter Best from 1921 
Harry Huntington ca. 1948 until 1957 (afterwards station master at Wennington)
A. C. Phillips 1957 - 1958 (formerly station master at Whatstandwell, afterwards station master at Pelsall)
Alfred George Armitage 1958 - ca. 1960 (afterwards station master at Harlington)

Services
All services at Cromford are operated by East Midlands Railway.

Saturdays also have an hourly service but all the trains originate or end in Derby.

On Sundays, there is a two-hourly service between Matlock and Nottingham in the morning, with services increasing to hourly from mid-afternoon onwards.

See also
Listed buildings in Cromford

References

External links

 Cromford Station Waiting Room
  "Ingenious.org"  Express train at Cromford station, 1911
 "Geograph" Cromford Station
 "English Heritage" Railway Station, Cromford, Derbyshire as it is now
 Friends of the Derwent Valley Line
 Peak Rail
 Derwent Valley Line East Midlands Trains Community Rail Partnership

Grade II listed buildings in Derbyshire
Railway stations in Derbyshire
DfT Category F2 stations
Former Midland Railway stations
Railway stations in Great Britain opened in 1849
Railway stations served by East Midlands Railway
Railway stations in Great Britain opened in 1840
Railway stations in Great Britain closed in 1863
Railway stations in Great Britain opened in 1863
Railway stations in Great Britain closed in 1876
Railway stations in Great Britain opened in 1876
1840 establishments in England